Pallion is a Tyne and Wear Metro station, serving the suburb of Pallion, City of Sunderland in Tyne and Wear, England. It joined the network on 31 March 2002, following the opening of the Wearside extension – a project costing in the region of £100million. The station was used by 92,060 passengers in 2017–18, making it the least-used station on the network.

Original station
The old station opened in June 1853, as part of the Penshaw branch of the York, Newcastle and Berwick Railway. Following the Beeching Axe, the line was closed, with the station being closed to passengers in May 1964, along with Hylton, and to goods in July 1965. At nearby Millfield, passenger service was withdrawn in May 1955, with goods facilities remaining until the late 1970s.

Metro era
Between Pallion and Millfield, it was necessary for the Tyne and Wear Metro route to deviate from the original alignment, owing to the construction of a road. A new trackbed was cut in to a steep slope, and extensively retained with piling, along with the construction of a new road bridge.

Along with other stations on the line between Fellgate and South Hylton, the station is fitted with vitreous enamel panels designed by artist Morag Morrison. Each station uses a different arrangement of colours, with strong colours used in platform shelters and ticketing areas, and a more neutral palate for external elements.

The station was used by 92,060 passengers in 2017–18, making Pallion the least used station on the network – closely followed by St Peter's and Bank Foot.

Facilities 
Step-free access is available at all stations across the Tyne and Wear Metro network, with ramped access to both platforms at Pallion. The station is equipped with ticket machines, waiting shelter, seating, next train information displays, timetable posters, and an emergency help point on both platforms. Ticket machines are able to accept payment with credit and debit card (including contactless payment), notes and coins. The station is also fitted with smartcard validators, which feature at all stations across the network.

There is no dedicated car parking available at the station. There is the provision for cycle parking, with five cycle pods available for use.

Services 
, the station is served by up to five trains per hour on weekdays and Saturday, and up to four trains per hour during the evening and on Sunday.

Rolling stock used: Class 599 Metrocar

References

External links 
 
Timetable and station information for Pallion

Sunderland
2002 establishments in England
Railway stations in Great Britain opened in 2002
Tyne and Wear Metro Green line stations
Transport in the City of Sunderland
Transport in Tyne and Wear